CCTV-2 is a Chinese free-to-air television channel operated by China Central Television in the People's Republic of China. The channel broadcasts programs on the economy and life services.

History 

CCTV-2 was launched in 1973 as China's first color TV network and broadcast primarily educational programmes.

In 1983, CCTV-2 shifted its programming to broadcast sports events, agricultural programmes, variety shows and reruns of CCTV-1 productions.cctv camera tips and trick TV series from other countries.

In 2000, the channel was rebranded as "CCTV Economic Life and Service Channel".

On 24 August 2009, CCTV2 was rebranded again as "CCTV Business Channel". Television programmes not related to finance, economics or life service were moved to CCTV-3 and CCTV-10.

Content 
Programs broadcast on CCTV-2 are mainly about:

 Energy conservation
 Stock exchange
 Scams (Buyer Beware)
 Finance and consumer related game shows

Programmes 
 Dialogue
 Secret Homage to Hero
 Geeker Go
 We Are Young
 Is It True?
 Shi Zhan Shang Xue Yuan

References

China Central Television channels
Business-related television channels
Television channels and stations established in 1973
1973 establishments in China